Eyemouth Lifeboat Station is a Royal National Lifeboat Institution (RNLI) marine-rescue facility in Eyemouth, Berwickshire, Scotland.

The station was founded in 1876 to protect local fisherman during periods of poor weather conditions. The original lifeboat house in the town cost £500 to build. This was replaced in 1908 with a new boathouse, with new facilities completed in 1992, and extended in 2010 at a cost of over £200,000. The station's lifeboat has been placed in the town's harbour afloat since the 1960s with a pontoon berth most recently been added in 2008.

The station currently has the RNLB Helen Hastings all weather Shannon-class lifeboat and MYWAY inshore  in service. The station has received two RNLI medals of recognition, one silver in 1991 and a bronze from 1917.

Fleet

References

External links
 RNLI station page
 Local History Site with pictures of old Lifeboats and Lifeboat men
 Facebook page with updates from the current crew and staff

Lifeboat stations in Scotland
Eyemouth